The Civilian Power or Citizens' Force (GS; ; Grazhdanskaya sila, GS) is a green-liberal political party in the Russian Federation. The organization was called the Network Party for Support of the Small and Middle Business in 2002, then renamed Free Russia in 2004, and in February 2007 changed to Civilian Power.

Members of the political council include:

 Mikhail Barshchevsky
 Valdis Pelsh
 Tatyana Ustinova
 Maxim Kononenko
 Eduard Uspensky

The Party's names 

 Network Party for Support of the Small and Middle Business (RSP, 2002–2004)
 Free Russia Party (PSR, 2004—2007)
 Civilian Power  (GS, 2007—2008)
 All-Russian Public Organization "Civilian Forces" (OOO GS, 2008—2012)
 Civilian Power  (GS, 2012—)

History
The "Free Russia" party was created in 2004, based on small and medium-sized Russian businesses. On October 8, 2006, the party overtook the 7% barrier on the legislative elections in Novgorod District. In November 2006, the 6th party conference was held. On February 27, 2007, Mikhail Barshchevsky, the chairman and plenipotentiary of the High Council of the Russian government, held a press conference. This was in aid of the party principles of Civilian Power. In the middle of April 2007, an organizational conference was held.

The chairman of the High Council is plenipotentiary of the Government of Russia in Constitutional, Supreme and Highest Arbitral Courts Mikhail Barshchevsky (a member since December 2006). The chairman of the Federal Political Council − The founder of the party, businessman Alexander Ryavkin from 2014 - 2015 year was the vice governor of the Oryol region.

The party won 1.05% of votes in the 2007 elections, not breaking the 7% barrier, and thus no seats in duma.

Civilian Power supported Dmitri Medvedev as their candidate in the presidential election in 2008.

It merged with Union of Right Forces and the Democratic Party of Russia to form the Right Cause on 16 November 2008.

Civilian Power was again registered as a political party on 7 June 2012.

The party advocates the legalization of prostitution in Russia.

In the elections of 2014, the party won one seat in the regional parliament Nenets Autonomous Okrug.

Electoral results
In 2017, the Party announced that the only candidate whom the party will support is current president Vladimir Putin. for the 2018 Russian presidential election.

Presidential elections

Legislative elections

References

External links
Civilian Power, official site (in Russian)

2003 establishments in Russia
2008 disestablishments in Russia
2012 establishments in Russia
Liberal parties in Russia
Green liberalism
Green political parties in Russia
Political parties disestablished in 2008
Political parties established in 2003
Political parties established in 2012
Registered political parties in Russia